Auf Wiedersehen  is a 1961 West German film directed by Harald Philipp and starring Gert Fröbe, Joachim Fuchsberger, Günter Pfitzmann, Werner Peters and Elke Sommer. It was based on a novel by Reinhold Pabel and features Louis Armstrong in a cameo role.

It was shot at the Spandau Studios in Berlin. Location shooting took place in Gibraltar, Spain and Berlin. The film's sets were designed by the art directors Otto Erdmann and Oskar Pietsch.

Cast
 Gert Fröbe as Angelo Pirrone
 Joachim Fuchsberger as Ferdinand Steinbichler
 Günter Pfitzmann as Willi Kuhlke
 Elke Sommer as Suzy Dalton
 Werner Peters as Paul Blümel
 Margot Eskens as Anna Kuhlke
 Heinz Weiss as Steve O'Hara
 Kurd Pieritz as Gus Wheeler
 Fritz Tillmann as George Dalton
 Stanislav Ledinek as Konrad Czerny
 Hans W. Hamacher as William Shake
 Peter Capell as Louis Holloway
 Heinrich Gies as Don Howley
 Hendrik Sick as Pietro
 Louis Armstrong as himself
 Kurt Pratsch-Kaufmann as Mario Malfi

References

Bibliography
 Bock, Hans-Michael & Bergfelder, Tim. The Concise Cinegraph: Encyclopaedia of German Cinema. Berghahn Books, 2009.

External links
 

1961 films
West German films
1960s German-language films
German spy comedy films
Films based on American novels
Films based on German novels
Films set in the United States
World War II spy films
1960s spy comedy films
Films directed by Harald Philipp
German satirical films
UFA GmbH films
1960s satirical films
1961 comedy films
Films shot at Spandau Studios
Films shot in Spain
1960s German films